Angela Rock is a former Olympic volleyball player.  She was born on October 15, 1963 in California. Angela was a collegiate athlete at San Diego State University and became an Olympic volleyball athlete in 1988. Along with the Olympics, she participated in the 1977 Pan American games, the Goodwill Games, the Women's Professional Volleyball Association (WPVA), and the Federation De International Volleyball tours. Angela won 27 beach volleyball events, and in 1991 she was named the Women's Professional Volleyball Associations top hitter. After her Olympic and professional volleyball career, she became a coach and an author.

Before and During Olympic life

Early life
Angela Rock fell in love with the idea of being an Olympian as a junior at El Toro High School despite not initially being interested in team sports. In high school, she was a multi-sport athlete including basketball, volleyball, track, and softball. When the Olympic volleyball coach, Arlie Serlinger, hosted a practice with two El Toro players, Rock joined them. After a successful high school season, San Diego State offered her a scholarship to play indoor volleyball.

Collegiate Life and Journey to the Olympics 
Angela was a student-athlete at San Diego State University as a member of the Volleyball team that made ranked in the Final Four in 1981 and 1982. By her junior year, her attitude resulted in her cut from the team. She rejoined the team her senior year. In 1984, Rock ended her senior year tying a school record of 81 serving aces and 752 kills and was named a First Team All-American in her collegiate league. She was inducted into the University's Hall of Fame. Rock graduated with a B.A. in Psychology. In December 1984, she began to train for the American Beach National Team for February 1985 tryouts. She made the team of 13 players and was named the MVP her first year. She participated in indoor volleyball in the 1988 Games in Seoul, South Korea where America ranked 7th. Rock received a Masters in Physical Education at National University and a Masters in Education from Azusa Pacific University.

After Olympic Life 
After a successful 30 years of volleyball, Angela retired in 2000 to become a coach, educator, and an author.

Author 
Angela shared her experience in the book Angela Rock's Advanced Beach Volleyball Tactics, a guide to both indoor and outdoor volleyball. The book topics include warm ups outside the physical court, responsibilities of a setter, effective blocking, and defense strategies.

Coaching and Career 
Rock was the head coach at The University of Alaska Fairbanks, Cuyamaca college, UC Santa Barbara, Southwestern Community College in San Diego, Saint Mary's College in Morago, CA and the San Diego State University Men's volleyball team. She was an Olympic coach in 1996 for Holly McPeak and Nancy Reno. She currently works in education management.

Achievements 
 1981- National Collegiate Athletic Association Final Four member
 1982- National Collegiate Athletic Association Final Four member
 1984- San Diego State University most valuable player
 1984- Named a First Team All American
 1985- USA Volleyball most valuable player
 1987- Pan American Games Silver medal recipient
 1991- Named Women's Professional Volleyball Association tour's best hitter
 1992- Almeria Spain Beach Exhibition Olympics Silver Medal recipient
 1993- Association of Volleyball Professionals Tour champion and Inducted into Beach Volleyball Hall of Fame

References

Living people
1963 births
American women's volleyball players
Sportspeople from California
San Diego State Aztecs women's volleyball players
Olympic volleyball players of the United States
College women's volleyball coaches in the United States
College men's volleyball coaches in the United States
Azusa Pacific University alumni
Volleyball players at the 1988 Summer Olympics
Pan American Games medalists in volleyball
Pan American Games bronze medalists for the United States
Medalists at the 1987 Pan American Games